General Creagh may refer to:

Michael O'Moore Creagh (1892–1970), British Army major general
O'Moore Creagh (1848–1923), British Army general

See also
Charles Creagh-Osborne (1823–1892), British Army lieutenant general
Steven A. Cray (born 1964), U.S. Air Force major general